National Cycle Route 42 is a part of the National Cycle Network running from Glasbury in Mid Wales to Gloucester in England. It provides a north–south link from Route 8 (Lon Las Cymru) to Route 4, and provides an alternative south route for Lon Las Cymru for those starting at Chepstow instead of Cardiff. It is also part of the Celtic Trail.

This should not be confused with Regional Cycle Route 42 in Suffolk.

Route 

Starting in Wales, from north to south, it passes through:

 Glasbury, connecting to Route 8 (Lon Las Cymru)
 Llanthony
 Abergavenny, connecting to the Four Castles cycle route and crossing Route 46
 Usk, connecting to the proposed Route 30
 Pen-y-cae-mawr, a small hamlet where Route 32 is proposed to provide a shortcut to bypass Chepstow, rejoining Route 42 at Tintern.
 Chepstow, connecting to Route 4

The route is proposed to turn east from Chepstow into England, staying north of the Severn Estuary, but this part of the route is not yet complete. It will pass through:

 Cinderford, connecting with Route 44
 Gloucester

National Cycle Routes
Cycleways in Wales
Cycleways in England
Cycleways in Powys
Transport in Monmouthshire
Transport in Gloucestershire